Christopher Lewis may refer to:
Christopher Lewis (priest) (born 1944), former Dean of Christ Church, Oxford
Christopher Lewis (screenwriter) (1944–2021) American writer and film producer
Christopher Lewis (tennis) (born 1956), American tennis player
Christopher D. Lewis (born 1957), Ontario police officer
Christopher John Lewis (1964–1997), New Zealander who attempted to assassinate Queen Elizabeth II

See also
Chris Lewis (disambiguation)